Frederick Greenhalge Sweetland (November 1893 – February 4, 1958) was a professional football player. He played in the American Professional Football League (which became the National Football League in 1922) with the  Akron Pros and the New York Brickley Giants. Brickley's New York Giants are not related to the modern-day New York Giants.

Prior to joining the NFL, Ray played college football at Fordham University and Washington and Lee University.

References

1893 births
Akron Pros players
Fordham Rams football players
New York Brickley Giants players
Washington and Lee Generals football players
Players of American football from Massachusetts
Sportspeople from Everett, Massachusetts
1958 deaths